Marjorie Hughes (born Marjorie Carle, December 15, 1925) is an American singer.

Career 
Hughes is the daughter of bandleader and pianist Frankie Carle, and began her career as a singer in her father's band. After singers Betty Bonney (aka Judy Johnson) and Phyllis Lynne had come and gone, Carle was auditioning new female singers – some in person, and some by means of demo records. Carle's wife sneaked in a demo of their daughter recorded from a radio program, where she was singing with the Paul Martin band in her first singing job. Carle liked the singer he heard on the demo, at first unaware that it was Marjorie. When he decided to give his daughter a chance with his band, Carle changed her name to Marjorie Hughes, so that the public wouldn't know she was his daughter until he could be certain she'd make the grade. The band made a hit record with Marjorie on the vocal, entitled "Oh, What It Seemed To Be." With the success of that song, Walter Winchell announced that Marjorie Hughes was actually Frankie Carle's daughter.

Marjorie stopped singing with the Carle orchestra in 1948 "because of illness." By 1950, she was working in television and radio on the west coast. In 1949, she was the featured female singer on Your Hit Parade on Parade.

Personal life
Marjorie married to Hughey Hughes, a pianist with Carle's orchestra in 1945; after four years of marriage, they divorced in 1949.

References

1925 births
Possibly living people
Big band singers
Musicians from Springfield, Massachusetts